Jackson Township is a township in Carter County, in the U.S. state of Missouri.

Jackson Township was established in 1873, taking its name from President Andrew Jackson.

References

Townships in Missouri
Townships in Carter County, Missouri